{{DISPLAYTITLE:Sigma1 Ursae Majoris}}

Sigma1 Ursae Majoris (σ1 UMa) is the Bayer designation for a solitary star in the northern circumpolar constellation of Ursa Major. With an apparent visual magnitude of 5.14 it is faintly visible to the naked eye on dark nights. Based upon an annual parallax shift of 6.26 mas, it is located roughly 520 light years from the Sun. At that distance, the visual magnitude of the star is diminished by an extinction factor of 0.06 due to interstellar dust.

This is an evolved K-type giant star with a stellar classification of K5 III. It is a suspected variable with an amplitude of 0.03 magnitude. The star is radiating around 560 times the solar luminosity from its outer atmosphere at an effective temperature of 3,940 K.

Naming
With π1, π2, σ2, ρ, A and d, it composed the Arabic asterism Al Ṭhibā᾽, the Gazelle. According to the catalogue of stars in the Technical Memorandum 33-507 - A Reduced Star Catalog Containing 537 Named Stars, Al Ṭhibā were the title for seven stars : A as Althiba I, this star (π1) as Althiba II, π2 as Althiba III, ρ as Althiba IV, this star (σ1) as Althiba V, σ2 as Althiba VI, and d as Althiba VII.

References

K-type giants
Ursa Major (constellation)
Ursae Majoris, Sigma
BD+67 0573
Ursae Majoris, 11
077800
044857
3609
Althiba V